The hectare (SI symbol: ha) is a non-SI metric unit of area equal to a square with 100-metre sides (1 hm2), or 10,000 m2, and is primarily used in the measurement of land. There are 100 hectares in one square kilometre.

In 1795, when the metric system was introduced, the are was defined as 100 square metres, or one square decametre, and the hectare ("hecto-" + "are") was thus 100 ares or  km2 (10,000 square metres). When the metric system was further rationalised in 1960, resulting in the International System of Units, the are was not included as a recognised unit. The hectare, however, remains as a non-SI unit accepted for use with the SI and whose use is "expected to continue indefinitely". Though the dekare/decare daa (1,000 m2) and are (100 m2) are not officially "accepted for use", they are still used in some contexts.

Description 

The hectare, although not a unit of SI, is the only named unit of area that is accepted for use with SI units. The name was coined in French, from the Latin ārea. In practice the hectare is fully derived from the SI, being equivalent to a square hectometre. It is widely used throughout the world for the measurement of large areas of land, and it is the legal unit of measure in domains concerned with land ownership, planning, and management, including law (land deeds), agriculture, forestry, and town planning throughout the European Union and 
Australia (since 1970). 
However, the United Kingdom, United States, Burma, and to some extent Canada use the acre instead.

Some countries that underwent a general conversion from traditional measurements to metric measurements (e.g. Canada) required a resurvey when units of measure in legal descriptions relating to land were converted to metric units.  Others, such as South Africa, published conversion factors which were to be used particularly "when preparing consolidation diagrams by compilation".

In many countries, metrification redefined or clarified existing measures in terms of metric units. The following legacy units of area have been redefined as being equal to one hectare:
Jerib in Iran
Djerib in Turkey
Gongqing in China
Manzana in Argentina
Bunder in the Netherlands (until 1937)

History 
The metric system of measurement was first given a legal basis in 1795 by the French Revolutionary government.  The law of 18 Germinal, Year III (7 April 1795) defined five units of measure:
The :metre for length
The are (100 m2) for area [of land]
The stère (1 m3) for volume of stacked firewood
The :litre (1 dm3) for volumes of liquid
The gram for mass

In 1960, when the metric system was updated as the International System of Units (SI), the are did not receive international recognition.  The International Committee for Weights and Measures makes no mention of the are in the current (2006) definition of the SI, but classifies the hectare as a "Non-SI unit accepted for use with the International System of Units".

In 1972, the European Economic Community (EEC) passed directive 71/354/EEC, which catalogued the units of measure that might be used within the Community.  The units that were catalogued replicated the recommendations of the CGPM, supplemented by a few other units including the are (and implicitly the hectare) whose use was limited to the measurement of land.

Unit family 

The names centiare, deciare, decare and hectare are derived by adding the standard metric prefixes to the original base unit of area, the are.

Decimilliare 

Centiare 
The centiare is one square metre.

Deciare 
The deciare (rarely used) is ten square metres.

Are 
The are ( or ) is a unit of area, equal to 100 square metres, used for measuring land area. It was defined by older forms of the metric system, but is now outside the modern International System of Units (SI). It is still commonly used in speech to measure real estate, in particular in Indonesia, India, and in various European countries.

In Russian and some other languages of the former Soviet Union, the are is called  (: 'a hundred', i.e. 100 m2 or  hectare). It is used to describe the size of suburban dacha or allotment garden plots or small city parks where the hectare would be too large. Many Russian dachas are 6 ares in size (in Russian).

Decare 
The decare or dekare is derived from deca and are, and is equal to 10 ares or 1000 square metres.  It is used in Norway and in the former Ottoman areas of the Middle East and Bulgaria as a measure of land area.  Instead of the name "decare", the names of traditional land measures are usually used, redefined as one decare:
 in Greece
 in the Balkans, Israel, Palestine, Jordan, Lebanon, Syria and Turkey
 is used for decare in Norway, from the old measure of about the same area.

Conversions 

The most commonly used units are in bold.

One hectare is also equivalent to:
 1 square hectometre 
 15 mǔ or 0.15 qǐng
 10 dunam or dönüm (Middle East)
 10 stremmata (Greece)
 6.25 rai (Thailand)
 approximately 1.008 chō (Japan)
 approximately 2.381 feddan (Egypt)

See also 
 Conversion of units
 Hectometre
 Order of magnitude

References

External links 

 Official SI website: Table 6. Non-SI units accepted for use with the International System of Units

Units of area
Non-SI metric units